Happy and Glorious may refer to:
Happy and Glorious (TV series), a 1952 British TV drama series about Queen Victoria and Prince Albert
Happy and Glorious, a short film starring Queen Elizabeth II and Daniel Craig as James Bond shown as part of the 2012 Olympic Games opening ceremony